Derry is a townland in the parish of Desertserges, County Cork, Ireland.

Historical sites include a kiln, ringfort and 2 standing stones.

See also
 List of townlands of the barony of Duhallow

References 

Townlands of County Cork